Holul or Halul may refer to:
 Holul, Kermanshah
 Holul, Markazi
 Halul Island, and island in the Persian Gulf belonging to Qatar